Karla Roffeis (later Mügge, born 4 July 1958 in Crivitz, Bezirk Schwerin) is a German former volleyball player who competed for East Germany in the 1976 Summer Olympics and in the 1980 Summer Olympics.

In 1976 she was part of the East German team which finished sixth in the Olympic tournament. She played all five matches.

Four years later she won the silver medal with the East German team in the 1980 Olympic tournament. She played all five matches again.

Now she is a teacher at the "Gymnasium am Sonnenberg" in Crivitz, Mecklenburg-Vorpommern, Germany.

External links
 profile

1951 births
Living people
People from Crivitz
People from Bezirk Schwerin
German women's volleyball players
Olympic volleyball players of East Germany
Sportspeople from Mecklenburg-Western Pomerania
Volleyball players at the 1976 Summer Olympics
Volleyball players at the 1980 Summer Olympics
Olympic silver medalists for East Germany
Olympic medalists in volleyball
Medalists at the 1980 Summer Olympics
Recipients of the Patriotic Order of Merit in bronze
20th-century German women